This list embraces topographical watersheds and drainage basins and other topics focused on them.

Terms – different uses
The source of a river or stream is the furthest place from its estuary or confluence with another river, and is alternatively known as a "watershed" and/or "headwaters" in some countries.
The confluence is the meeting of two rivers or streams, and may sometimes be known as "headwaters".
A drainage basin is an area of land where all surface water converges to a single point at a lower elevation. In North America, "watershed" is used for this sense, while elsewhere terms like "catchment" or "drainage area" are used.
A drainage divide is the line that separates neighboring drainage basins. In English-speaking countries outside of North America, this is normally known as a "watershed".

Drainage divides 
Drainage divides category
The European Watershed, the line dividing the drainage basins of the major rivers of Europe
The Drainage divides, the lines dividing drainage basins in North America (i.e.: Great Basin Divide and Great Basin hydrologic region)

Watersheds and drainage basins 
Basins category
Drainage basins category
List of drainage basins by area: A worldwide list of watersheds
Drainage basins of the Atlantic Ocean category
Drainage basins of the Arctic Ocean category

Watersheds - basins by country
Watersheds of Canada category
Watersheds of the United States category
Drainage systems of Australia category

Examples
Lake Erie Watershed (Pennsylvania)
Guadalupe Watershed
Hudson River Watershed
Humber Watershed
Turtle Creek Watershed

Watershed and drainage basin organisations and institutions

Management organisations
Watershed management, the management of drainage basins
Watershed Protection and Flood Prevention Act, a United States law controlling drainage and water storage
Watershed district (Minnesota), one of a number of government entities in the US state of Minnesota which monitor and regulate the use of water in drainage basins
Watershed district (Russia), one of twenty groups of water bodies listed in the Water Code of the Russian Federation

Examples
Council for Watershed Health
Great Swamp Watershed Association
Minnehaha Creek Watershed District
Santa Fe Watershed Association
Walla Walla Basin Watershed Council
Yukon River Inter-Tribal Watershed Council

Study institutions
University of South Carolina Upstate: Center for Watershed Ecology

Other uses

Watershed College, Zimbabwe
Watershed Media Centre, Bristol, England
Stony Brook Millstone Watershed Arboretum
"River of Words"; watersheds as subject poetry competition

-
 List of Watershed topics
Watershed
Water and the environment